Walid Salah El-Din (Arabic وليد صلاح الدين) (born  October 27, 1971) is an Egyptian footballer. Walid played as an attacking midfielder for Egyptian club side El-Ahly as well as the Egypt national football team.

He played for Egypt at the 1999 FIFA Confederations Cup.

References

External links

1971 births
Living people
Egyptian footballers
Egypt international footballers
1999 FIFA Confederations Cup players
Al Ahly SC players
Al Ittihad Alexandria Club players
Egyptian Premier League players
Association football midfielders